Ning Jinsheng (October 22, 1932 – March 15, 2020) was a Chinese engineer who was a professor at Wuhan University, a president of Wuhan University of Surveying and Mapping Technology, and an academician of the Chinese Academy of Engineering (CAE).

Biography
Ning was born in Tianjin, on October 22, 1932, while his ancestral home was in Tongcheng County, Anhui. After graduating in 1956, he was assigned to Wuhan Institute of Surveying and Mapping as an assistant. In May 1966, during the Cultural Revolution, he was forced to work in the dining room instead of teaching in classrooms. In August 1984, he was appointed vice-president of Wuhan University of Surveying and Mapping Technology, rising to the president position in January 1988. In August 2000, Wuhan University of Surveying and Mapping Technology was merged into Wuhan University, and he served as professor and doctoral supervisor of the university. On March 15, 2020, he died in Wuhan, Hubei, aged 87.

Honours and awards
 1995 Member of the Chinese Academy of Engineering (CAE)

References

1932 births
2020 deaths
Chinese geodesists
Engineers from Tianjin
Tongji University alumni
Academic staff of Wuhan University
Members of the Chinese Academy of Engineering